The Louisiana State Police (French: Police d’Etat de Louisiane) is the state police agency of Louisiana, which has jurisdiction anywhere in the state, headquartered in Baton Rouge. It falls under the authority of the Louisiana Department of Public Safety & Corrections. It is officially known in that organization as the Office of State Police.

The Louisiana State Police is a premier law enforcement agency in Louisiana and was accredited by the Commission on Accreditation for Law Enforcement Agencies (CALEA) from 2003 to 2008. The agency voluntarily ceased its association with CALEA in 2008. The agency has approximately 1,200 officers as of 2021.

History

These inspectors patrolled exclusively by motorcycles. These motorcycles were personally owned by the individual patrolmen, and maintained by an allowance from the state. Of the 16 men on the force, one was a captain. This captain served as superintendent of the force. The highway commission was divided into ten districts. The Baton Rouge District had two patrol officers, while the New Orleans District had three patrolmen. The other eight districts had one patrol officer each. The other two officers patrolled statewide on the main highways of the state. In 1928 the agency was known as the Law Enforcement Division of the Highway Commission, and employed 70 uniformed officers. The Bureau of Criminal Investigation was also formed about that time. In 1932, the organization's name was changed to the State Highway Patrol, and it was given the authority to carry firearms. The agency was used by Governor Huey Long as his personal bodyguards, who escorted him across the state. In 1936, the two divisions of law enforcement were combined, by an act of the Louisiana Legislature, to form the Louisiana Department of State Police. The department's force of patrolmen numbered over 40 at that time, and the primary patrol vehicle was the motorcycle. In 1939, the State Police was divided into eight "troops". Troopers in cars and motorcycles were patrolling nearly 2 million miles per year throughout the state. The agency's fleet of patrol motorcycles eventually grew to 64 motorcycles. In 1942 the Louisiana Legislature abolished the Department of State Police and made it a division of the newly created Department of Public Safety. The state police accepted new responsibilities in 1946, when the state's Drivers License Law was enacted requiring every driver to hold a license for operating a motor vehicle. Prior to this time, only the operators of commercial vehicles, trucks, and buses were required to be licensed in Louisiana. In 1948, the number of motorcycles operated by the agency had fallen to 36 motorcycles. The department was relying more heavily on automobiles for patrol purposes, and eventually patrol motorcycles were only found in New Orleans and other major cities. Motorcycle patrol units were used throughout the 1950s, with Governor Earl Kemp Long also using them as bodyguards. In the 1960s, the department was utilizing motorcycles, automobiles, airplanes, and helicopters for enforcement purposes. The department had exclusively used Harley-Davidson motorcycles until the 1980s when it switched to Kawasaki motorcycles. A short time after this switch, the motorcycle patrol program was disbanded. In 1997, patrol motorcycles were brought back on the force.

In July 2018, Trooper, Kasha Domingue shot a male passenger in the back who was unarmed at a 2018 traffic stop behind a Perkins Road store causing a severe injury to his spinal cord.
A grand jury indicted Trooper Kasha Domingue, 43 of Baton Rouge on Thursday, Oct. 1, 2020 on charges of aggravated second-degree battery and illegal use of a weapon in the shooting of Clifton Dilley, a Baton Rouge man who was 19 at the time. The indictment marked the first time in District Attorney Hillar Moore III's 11-plus years as prosecutor that an officer was charged with a crime after killing or injuring a civilian with gunfire.

In September 2018, the Louisiana State Police were scrutinized for using lists of personal information about supposed Antifa members which were posted on 8chan's politics board. The file "antifa.docx" was found in police databases and led directly to the opening of criminal investigations.

In 2019 a Louisiana State Police unit stunned, punched, dragged and ultimately killed Ronald Greene, a Black motorist who had failed to pull over for an unspecified traffic violation. A federal civil rights investigation was conducted and the state set up a panel to investigate several incidents of misconduct, including filing of false reports. In 2021, the ACLU called for a federal investigation into the Louisiana State Police. State Police brass initially argued the troopers’ use of force was justified — “awful but lawful,” as ranking officials described it — and did not open an administrative investigation until 474 days after Greene's death.

Patrol areas
The department is divided into nine troops, with its headquarters in Baton Rouge. The troops are divided as follows:
 Troop A (Baton Rouge): covers the following 9 parishes: Ascension, East Baton Rouge, East Feliciana, Iberville, Livingston, St. James (east bank), Pointe Coupee, West Baton Rouge, West Feliciana
 Troop B (Kenner): covers 6 parishes: Orleans, St. Charles, St. John (east bank), Plaquemines, St. Bernard, Jefferson
 Troop C (Houma): covers the 5 parishes of Assumption, Lafourche, Terrebonne, and the west banks of St. James and St. John
 Troop D (Lake Charles): covers the 5 parishes of Allen, Beauregard, Calcasieu, Cameron and Jefferson Davis
 Troop E (Alexandria): covers the parishes of Avoyelles, Catahoula, Concordia, Grant, LaSalle, Natchitoches, Rapides, Sabine, Vernon and Winn
 Troop F (Monroe): covers the Parishes of Union, West Carroll, East Carroll, Morehouse, Lincoln, Ouachita, Richland, Madison, Jackson, Caldwell, Tensas, and Franklin.
 Troop G (Bossier City): covers the Parishes of Caddo, Bossier, De Soto, Webster, Claiborne, Bienville, and Red River.
 Troop I (Lafayette): covers Parishes of Evangeline, St. Landry, Acadia, Lafayette, St. Martin, Vermilion, Iberia, and St. Mary.
 Troop L (Covington): covers the parishes of St. Helena, St. Tammany, Tangipahoa and Washington

Disbanded troops
The following troops are no longer in existence:
 Troop H (Leesville) comprised Vernon, as the home base parish, and Sabine and Beauregard Parishes.  It was disbanded in 1988 due to budget considerations.
 Troop K (Opelousas) included Avoyelles, Evangeline, Pointe Coupee, and St. Landry Parishes.  It was disbanded in 1988 due to budget considerations.
 Troop M (Des Allemands) closed in 1973 when merged into the current Troop C.  It comprised Lafourche, Terrebonne, Assumption, the West banks of St. Charles, St. John, and St. James Parishes.
 Troop N (Crowley) included Acadia and Vermilion parishes. Disbanded in 1969.
 Troop N (New Orleans): centered in and around the French Quarter of New Orleans.  Although initially not officially classified as a Troop, Troop N was reopened in New Orleans, in 2005, as headquarters for post-Hurricane Katrina operations until April 2006.  It was again reopened in April, 2015, to oversee deployments of temporary extra troopers to the New Orleans French Quarter detail. In late 2016, it was officially designated a Troop.  Due to issues with funding and the COVID-19 global pandemic, Troop N was again disbanded on December 31, 2020.
 Troop O (Delhi) comprised Franklin, Richland, Tensas, Madison, East and West Carroll Parishes.  Troop O was created in 1968.  It operated from the city hall building in Delhi, Louisiana. It was very short lived, lasting a mere 13 months before being disbanded in 1969.

Rank structure

Equipment

Firearms 
The current standard issue firearm for LSP Troopers is the Glock 17 in caliber 9mm or Glock 22 in caliber .40 S&W. Previously, the standard issue sidearm was the SIG Sauer P220 semi-automatic pistol in caliber .45 ACP. Other optional handguns are also authorized for carry on-duty. Each trooper is also issued a Remington 870 Police 12 gauge magnum shotgun. Troopers are also issued a Colt AR-15 or Bushmaster M4-type Carbine in .223, a Ruger Mini-14 in .223, or an H&K MP5 in 9mm. The troopers in this agency have been issued batons and pepper spray for quite some time. Tasers have also been introduced, and have been in service since 2005.

Patrol cars 

The current primary Louisiana State Police patrol vehicle is the Chevrolet Tahoe. The agency began a conversion to the Tahoe in 2012. Previously, the agency used the Ford Crown Victoria "Police Interceptor." This vehicle was the main patrol vehicle used by the agency from 1997 to 2011, when it replaced the Chevrolet Caprice in 1996, and when the Crown Victoria was discontinued in 2011. The vehicle's markings include "State Trooper" written on each front quarter panel, a state badge on the center of each front door, the words "Louisiana State Police" written above and below the door badge, and the words "State Police" written on the trunk. Note that the markings on the Tahoe include a slight variation to the previously used designs.  In 2012 all markings were re-designed.  The door badge has been redesigned from a light blue to a darker blue. Also the badge state seal in center was updated to reflect a 2008 change showing a more angular "Pelican in Her Piety" state seal done in white. It is completely different from the prior one used from 1964 to 2012 except in dimension. The red "LSP" lettering was also upgraded to a more reflective prismatic shade of ruby red, and each letter now has a small dark blue border around it. An "ACE" insignia, consisting of a blue State of Louisiana with a red lightning bolt, is awarded to troopers who recover five or more stolen vehicles within a year. Since approximately 2001, a majority of the marked patrol vehicles utilized by this agency have been equipped with onboard video cameras. Other 'marked' patrol vehicles currently used include Harley-Davidson motorcycles, the Chevrolet Camaro, the Chevrolet Tahoe and Suburban, with incidental examples fielded since 2013 of the Ford Taurus Interceptor, Ford Explorer Police and Caprice PPV. Announced on January 31, 2018, beginning in the succeeding month [February], newer models of the Dodge Charger were introduced. The latter included "less visible, semi-marked and unmarked" vehicles to "[...]combat aggressive, impaired, and distracted driving."

Special units

Like many other state police agencies around the United States, the Louisiana State Police has several sub-divisions specializing in addressing particular crimes or security needs. These include a Bomb Squad, an Air Support Unit, a Special Weapons And Tactics (SWAT) Team, an Executive Protection detail that functions under the Louisiana Department of Public Safety Police (for protection of the Louisiana Governor, Lt. Governor, other dignitaries, Capitol grounds, and other state owned facilities), a Motor Carrier Safety Enforcement (MCSAP) section, and a Hazardous Materials Response Unit.

The Criminal Investigations Division includes a Statewide Narcotics Task Force, a Concealed Handgun Permit Section, an Auto Theft Recovery Unit, the Casino Gaming & Licensing Section, a Criminal Intelligence Unit, Identity Theft Investigations, an Insurance Fraud Investigations Section, and a cyber crimes section which specializes in online and computer crimes.

The agency also operates the State Police Crime Laboratory.

The agency previously ran a section called the Anti-Terrorist Assistance Program (ATAP) which was a joint venture with the U.S. State Department. This ATAP section trained foreign police and military forces in detecting, preventing, and fighting of terrorism.

Fallen officers
Since its formation in 1922, 29 LSP troopers have been killed in the line of duty. The most common cause of line of duty deaths to date is automobile accidents.

In popular culture
The first season of HBO's True Detective depicted Matthew McConaughey and Woody Harrelson as Louisiana State Police detectives.

See also

 Louisiana State Troopers Association
 Louisiana Department of Wildlife & Fisheries - Enforcement Division
 List of law enforcement agencies in Louisiana
 State police
 State patrol
 Highway patrol
 Mike Edmonson
Joseph S. Cage Jr.

References

External links
 Louisiana State Police Website

State law enforcement agencies of Louisiana
Government agencies established in 1922
1922 establishments in Louisiana